Patricia M. Sloop (born 1940 or 1941) is an American politician who served in the Kansas House of Representatives as a Democrat from the 88th district for one term, from 2013 to 2014.

The Wichita Eagle described Sloop as a "political newcomer" when she first ran for the state legislature; she had worked as a social worker and professor before retiring and entering politics. The 88th district was an open seat following redistricting; Sloop won a relatively easy victory in the primary election, and then defeated Republican Joseph Scapa 53% to 47%. In 2014, Sloop ran for re-election, but faced a rematch with Scapa and lost narrowly with 49.8% of the vote.

References

Living people
Year of birth uncertain
Democratic Party members of the Kansas House of Representatives
Women state legislators in Kansas
21st-century American women politicians
21st-century American politicians
Politicians from Wichita, Kansas
Year of birth missing (living people)